The 2022 National League Wild Card Series were two best-of-three playoff series in Major League Baseball (MLB) to determine the participating teams of the 2022 National League Division Series. Both Wild Card Series began on October 7, with Game 2s scheduled for October 8 and Game 3s, if necessary, scheduled for October 9. ESPN broadcast both Wild Card Series, and games were broadcast by ESPN Radio.

Background
On March 10, Major League Baseball changed the postseason structure for the first time since 2012, adding a sixth team to the postseason in each league, awarding the top two seeds in each league to receive a bye into the Division Series, and added a best-of-three Wild Card round, with the higher seed hosting all three games. The lowest-seeded division winner, and three wild card teams (each seeded according to regular season record), will play in this round. The third seed will play the sixth seed, and the fourth seed will play the fifth seed. The postseason structure is similar to the temporarily format MLB used in 2020 due to the COVID-19 pandemic without first-round byes for the top two seeds in 2020.

The St. Louis Cardinals (93–69) clinched the National League Central, their fourth straight postseason appearance, first as the NL Central winner since 2019, locked into the third seed as the worst National League division winner in terms of record on September 27, and hosted the Philadelphia Phillies (87–75), who was the last team to clinch a postseason berth among the twelve playoff teams and making their first postseason appearance since 2011 on October 3. The Phillies won four of the seven match-ups against the Cardinals during the regular season.

The New York Mets (101–61) clinched a postseason berth on September 19, but they failed to win the National League East after losing their division lead on the last weekend of the season by the hands of a three-game sweep from Atlanta. The Mets made their first postseason appearance since 2016, were the second straight 100-win plus National League wild card team following the 106-win 2021 Los Angeles Dodgers, and hosted the San Diego Padres (89–73), who clinched their first postseason appearance since 2020 and just the second since 2006 on October 2. San Diego won both series against New York, defeating them 2–1 in early June and late July, for a total of 4–2.

As the top two seeds, the Los Angeles Dodgers (111–51) and Atlanta Braves (101–61) earned a bye and home-field advantage in the NLDS.

Matchups

(3) St. Louis Cardinals vs. (6) Philadelphia Phillies

(4) New York Mets vs. (5) San Diego Padres

St. Louis vs. Philadelphia
This is just the second postseason match-up between St. Louis and Philadelphia, but there has been a long history between the two teams. In their lone postseason match-up, the two teams previously met in the 2011 National League Division Series, which was won by the Cardinals in five games. The two teams were also involved in one of the more memorable pennant races in MLB history in 1964. It was notable for the Phillies losing a -game lead with 12 games left in the season to the St. Louis Cardinals. Additionally, the Cardinals and Phillies played in the National League East together for 25 seasons (1969–1993).

Game 1

Game 1 featured a pitching match-up between Phillies ace Zack Wheeler, who had not allowed a run to the Cardinals in  regular-season innings, and Jose Quintana, a Cardinals trade deadline acquisition. The game was scoreless until the seventh inning, when Juan Yepez hit a pinch-hit two-run home run off of Jose Alvarado, who had just relieved Wheeler. Yepez's home run was the first go-ahead pinch-hit home run in St. Louis Cardinals postseason history.

The score was still 2–0 in the top of the ninth when Cardinals closer Ryan Helsley, who had jammed fingers on his throwing hand in his previous appearance, allowed a single and two walks, then hit Alec Bohm with a 101-mph fastball, giving the Phillies their first run. With the bases still loaded, the next batter Jean Segura hit an opposite-field single to give the Phillies a 3–2 lead. The Phillies got three more runs in the inning, making the score 6–2. The Cardinals scored a run in their half of the ninth, but Zach Eflin struck out the game-tying run in Yadier Molina to give the Phillies their first postseason victory in 11 years. Before the game, the St. Louis Cardinals had been 93–0 when leading a postseason game by two or more runs in the ninth inning.

Game 2

Longtime Phillies ace Aaron Nola started his first postseason game against Miles Mikolas, who produced a 2.38 ERA at home in 14 starts. The Phillies scored two runs via a Bryce Harper solo home run in the second inning and a Kyle Schwarber sacrifice fly in the fifth and it was all the runs they needed. With the win, the Phillies won their first postseason series since the 2010 National League Division Series and advanced to play the Braves in the National League Division Series. For the Cardinals, this was the third straight year they lost in the opening round of the postseason.

Albert Pujols and Yadier Molina both got hits in their last at-bats and were removed for pinch-runners and both received standing ovations. Both were playing in the last game of their careers.

New York vs. San Diego
This is the first postseason match-up between New York and San Diego.

Game 1

In the top of the first inning, Max Scherzer was greeted with a two-run home run by Padres first baseman Josh Bell. That would be the theme of the night for Scherzer, who gave up four home runs on the night. Scherzer was the second pitcher to allow at least seven runs and four home runs in a postseason game, joining Gene Thompson who did it in the 1939 World Series against the Yankees. Trent Grisham added a solo shot in the second inning. Jurickson Profar's three-run homer off the right field foul pole in the fifth inning broke the game open for the Padres. The next batter, Manny Machado, capped the Padres' scoring with a solo home run.

Padres starter Yu Darvish worked out of jams in the first and second inning but proceeded to settle in as the game went along. He finished with seven innings pitched and one run allowed, which came via a Eduardo Escobar solo home run in the bottom of the fifth.

Game 2

The early innings of Game 2 were a back-and-forth affair. The Mets took 1–0 and 2–1 leads against Padres starter Blake Snell, but the Padres would answer against Mets starter Jacob deGrom to tie the game each time. The Mets, however, would take the lead for good in the bottom of the fifth inning after Pete Alonso's first career postseason home run gave them a 3–2 lead. DeGrom would limit the Padres to just two runs in his six innings of work. 

In an unconventional move by Mets manager Buck Showalter, Mets closer Edwin Díaz was called on to enter the game in the top of the seventh inning. Díaz would pitch a scoreless seventh inning before the Mets added four insurance runs against the Padres bullpen in the bottom half of the inning to extend the Mets' lead to 7–2. Díaz would record two outs in the top of the eighth inning before giving way to Adam Ottavino. Ottavino completed the eighth inning, but began to falter after recording two outs in the ninth inning, eventually walking in a run after the Padres had loaded the bases. Showalter called on Seth Lugo to record the final out of the game against Josh Bell, who represented the tying run at the plate with the Mets holding a 7–3 lead. Lugo would induce a groundout to record his first career postseason save and even the series at one game apiece.

Game 3

Joe Musgrove pitched seven scoreless innings of one–hit ball and Padres hitters scored six runs off of Chris Bassitt and the Mets bullpen as they advanced to the National League Division Series to face the Dodgers. With the loss, the Mets were the first 100-win or more team to fail to reach the Division Series since the Division Series was implemented in 1995.

See also
2022 American League Wild Card Series

References

External links

Major League Baseball postseason schedule

 

Wild Card Series
Major League Baseball Wild Card Series
New York Mets postseason
Philadelphia Phillies postseason
St. Louis Cardinals postseason
San Diego Padres postseason
National League Wild Card Series
National League Wild Card Series
National League Wild Card Series
National League Wild Card Series
National League Wild Card Series
National League Wild Card Series